Eric Christopher Lockett (born December 25, 1995)  is an American professional basketball player for ERA Nymburk of the National Basketball League. He played college basketball for George Mason, Chipola College, FIU and NC State from 2014 until 2019.

High school career
Lockett attended Whitefield Academy at Marietta, Georgia. As a senior, Lockett averaged 18 points, 9 rebounds and 4 assists per game.

College career
During his college career, Lockett attended George Mason, Chipola College, FIU and NC State from 2014 until 2019.

Professional career

Al-Rayyan
After going undrafted at the 2019 NBA Draft, Lockett joined Al-Rayyan in Qatar.

Bristol Flyers
On February, 2020, Lockett joined Bristol Flyers of the BBL. He played for two seasons with the club and in his second season, he went on to average 15 points and 7 rebounds and 4.2 assists per game.

Aris
On August 23, 2021, Lockett joined ENAD in Cyprus. However, he never appeared in a single game with the club, as he was transferred to Aris of the Greek Basket League. In 26 games, he averaged 6.1 points, 4 rebounds, 1.4 assists and 0.9 steals, playing around 22 minutes per contest and submitting tons of defensive energy to the court.

Basketball Nymburk
On August 8, 2022, he has signed with ERA Nymburk of the National Basketball League.

References

External links
NC State bio

1995 births
Living people
ABA League players
American men's basketball players
American expatriate basketball people in Greece
American expatriate basketball people in the United Kingdom
American expatriate basketball people in Qatar
Aris B.C. players
Bristol Flyers players